Bangladesh has an embassy in Washington D.C. and consulates in New York City and Los Angeles. The United States has an embassy in Dhaka, with information centers in Chittagong, Jessore, Rajshahi and Sylhet. The U.S. Embassy in Bangladesh also operates the Archer K Blood American Library and the Edward M Kennedy Centre in Dhaka. Both countries are members of the United Nations.

In 2014, 76% of Bangladeshis expressed a favorable view of the United States, one of the highest ratings for the countries surveyed in South Asia.

History 

Contacts between Bengal and the United States were limited during British rule in the Indian subcontinent. In the 1860s, a consular agency was established for Chittagong by the American Consulate General in Fort William. In World War II, substantial American naval, air and army forces were stationed in East Bengal as part of the Burma Campaign.

The United States established a consulate general in Dhaka on 29 August 1949, following the partition of India and east Bengal becoming the eastern wing of the Dominion of Pakistan. American teachers, architects and aid workers frequented the capital of East Pakistan in the 1960s.

During the Bangladesh Liberation War in 1971, American citizens led by the Consul General in Dacca, Archer K Blood, sent a series of telegrams detailing atrocities committed by the Pakistani military against Bengali civilians, students and intellectuals. They dissented with the Nixon administration’s policy of ignoring genocide due to the close American alliance with the Pakistani military junta. Within the US, public opinion also turned against Nixon for his policy on Bangladesh. Both Democratic and Republican lawmakers, including Ted Kennedy, Frank Church and William B. Saxbe, denounced the Nixon White House for its silence on the "systematic oppression" in East Pakistan. American cultural figures like the poet Allen Ginsberg (who wrote September on Jessore Road) and the singer Joan Baez promoted awareness of the Bangladesh War. The Concert for Bangladesh was organized in New York City by British, American and Indian musicians; and featured American icons like Bob Dylan. The U.S. Congress imposed an arms embargo on Pakistan; but despite that, the Nixon White House sent secret arms shipments to the junta. When India intervened in December 1971, the White House dispatched an aircraft carrier to the Bay on Bengal. Peace activists blocked arms shipments in several northeastern American ports. Bengali diplomats at the Pakistani embassy in Washington DC defected and operated a mission of the Provisional Government of Bangladesh.

After the liberation of Bangladesh in December 1971 and the withdrawal of Indian troops in March 1972, the United States formally recognized the newly independent country on 4 April 1972, and pledged US$300 million in aid. Herbert D. Spivack was the principal American diplomatic officer in Dhaka at the time. Four days later, the United States and Bangladesh agreed to establish diplomatic relations at the embassy level. The consulate-general was officially upgraded to an embassy on 18 May 1972. Relations between Bangladesh and the American-led Western world dramatically improved in the late 1970s, when President Ziaur Rahman reversed the socialist policies of the first post-independence government and restored free markets. In 1983, military ruler Lieutenant General Hussain Muhammad Ershad was invited to the White House for talks with President Ronald Reagan. President Reagan praised Dhaka for its role in the Cold War, stating "the United States wishes to applaud Bangladesh, a member of the nonaligned movement, for its constructive approach to issues of regional and global concern. To cite only a few examples: Bangladesh clearly manifested its courage and resolve in its unswerving responses to aggression in Afghanistan and Kampuchea. It also took the lead in establishing the South Asian Regional Cooperation Organization, a body designed to build a more prosperous and stable region for the people of South Asia. Bangladesh's foreign policy has exhibited an activism, moderation, and force of moral conviction which has earned the respect of the world".

The United States has been one of Bangladesh's principal development partners since independence, providing over US$6 billion through USAID since 1972. It has helped set up important infrastructure in the country, including NASA assistance for the Space Research and Remote Sensing Organization (SPARRSO) and a TRIGA research reactor in the Bangladesh Atomic Energy Commission.

Bangladeshi Nobel Laureate Muhammad Yunus has been awarded the US Presidential Medal of Freedom and the US Congressional Gold Medal, the highest civilian honours of the United States.

Present relations

Bangladesh is a major American ally in South Asia. The two countries have extensive cooperation on matters of regional and global security,  counter terrorism and climate change. Bangladesh has been a key participant in the Obama administration's main international development initiatives, including food security, healthcare and the environment. A strategic dialogue agreement was signed between the two countries in 2012. The US Ambassador to Bangladesh Marcia Bernicat in 2015 described relations as "vibrant, multi-faceted, and indispensable".

U.S. policy towards Bangladesh emphasizes political stability, human rights and democracy. The U.S. also views Bangladesh as a moderate Muslim ally among Islamic countries. Although relations are traditionally regarded as excellent, the United States has often been strongly critical of the political administration in Bangladesh for lack of respect of the rule of law, suppressing freedom of the press and human rights abuses by security forces, notably the Rapid Action Battalion. Following a general election boycotted by the main opposition party in 2014, the U.S. gave a cold shoulder to the Bangladeshi government.

According to American diplomats, U.S. policy in Bangladesh features the "three Ds", meaning Democracy, Development and Denial of space for terrorism.

As of 2016, Bangladesh is the largest recipient of U.S. assistance in Asia outside Afghanistan and Pakistan.

Trade and investment
The United States is the largest export market for Bangladesh. The U.S. is also one of the largest sources of foreign direct investment in Bangladesh. The biggest American investment in the country are the operations of Chevron, which produces 50% of Bangladesh's natural gas. Bilateral trade in 2014 stood at US$6 billion. The main American exports to Bangladesh are agricultural products (soybeans, cotton, wheat, dairy), aircraft, machinery, engines, and iron and steel products. American imports from Bangladesh include apparel, footwear, and textile products; toys, games and sporting goods; shrimp and prawns; and agricultural products.

In June 2013, following the 2013 Savar building collapse that led to over 1,000 deaths, the United States suspended a preferential trade agreement with Bangladesh that allowed for duty-free access to the US market over poor safety standards. The Bangladesh Foreign Ministry then issued a statement that read: "It cannot be more shocking for the factory workers of Bangladesh that the decision to suspend Generalized System of Preferences (GSP) comes at a time when the government of Bangladesh has taken concrete and visible measures to improve factory safety and protect workers' rights."

However, on the service sector export front, the United States is the largest export destination for Bangladesh's ICT industry accounting for 34 percent of Bangladesh's ICT exports (Latifee, E. H., 2022). Besides, the U.S. is the largest ICT market in the world representing 33 percent of the total or approximately US$ 1.8 trillion market size in 2022 with more than 0.52 million software and IT services companies collectively contributing 9.3 percent to the US GDP making them the top ICT export destination for Bangladesh as the USA has also the highest ICT spending per-capita (Latifee, E. H., 2022).

Defense cooperation

The United States is one of Bangladesh's principal strategic military allies. American defense cooperation is seen as a counterweight to the regional powers India and Russia. Joint exercises are held on a regular basis, particularly in the Bay of Bengal. The U.S. Pacific Command maintains regular engagements with the Bangladesh Armed Forces. The U.S. has also helped set up the elite SWADS marine unit in the Bangladesh Navy, which is modeled on American and South Korean special forces.

Bangladesh is the world's largest contributor to UN peacekeeping. The United States has been a vital supporter of Bangladeshi peacekeeping engagements.

Education and culture
There were 7,496 Bangladeshi students in U.S. universities in 2018, making Bangladesh 24th in the world among countries sending students to USA, and 10th in the world for sending Graduate level students. The American Embassy in Bangladesh operates and supports several Education Consultancy Centers in Dhaka, Chittagong, Sylhet and Rajshahi. Besides American Center, US Embassy also support the Edward M. Kennedy Center for Public Service & Arts and operates Archer K. Blood Library in Dhaka. On the cultural front, Sisimpur, a USAID-funded Bangladeshi version of Sesame Street, is the most watched children's program on Bangladeshi television.

Disaster management

The United States has assisted Bangladesh during cyclone relief operations in 1991 and 2007. Operation Sea Angel One in 1991 and Operation Sea Angel Two in 2007 saw US Marines joining Bangladeshi troops in providing relief to thousands of people in southern Bangladesh who suffered as a result of the 1991 Bangladesh Cyclone and Cyclone Sidr.

Bangladeshi diaspora in the U.S.
The US-Bangladesh relationship is strengthened by the Bangladeshi American community. Fazlur Rahman Khan designed the United States's tallest tower in Chicago. Sal Khan is a prominent educationist. Hansen Clarke was the first U.S. congressman of Bangladeshi origin. M. Osman Siddique served as US Ambassador to Fiji.

See also 
 Bangladeshi-Americans

References

Further reading
 Choudhury, G.W. India, Pakistan, Bangladesh, and the Major Powers: Politics of a Divided Subcontinent (1975), relations with US, USSR and China.

External links
 History of Bangladesh - US relations
 Trade in Goods with Bangladesh 
 Office of the US Trade Representative
 US Department of State
 US Embassy in Bangladesh
 Bangladesh Embassy in America

 
Bilateral relations of the United States
United States